State Bank of Hammond Building is a historic bank building located at 5444-5446 Calumet Avenue in Hammond, Lake County, Indiana.  It was built in 1927, and was designed by Chicago architects Vitzthum & Burns. It is a two-story, Classical Revival style brick, concrete, and steel building on a full basement.  The front facade is faced in terra cotta and features a colossal entry portico with two engaged square columns and two fluted round columns.  The Northern States Life Insurance Company ceased operation in 1931, and the building subsequently housed the Calumet State Bank from 1933 until 1935, and later a license bureau and other retail and office uses.

It was listed in the National Register of Historic Places in 1984.

See also
National Register of Historic Places listings in Lake County, Indiana

References

Hammond, Indiana
Bank buildings on the National Register of Historic Places in Indiana
Neoclassical architecture in Indiana
Commercial buildings completed in 1927
Buildings and structures in Lake County, Indiana
National Register of Historic Places in Lake County, Indiana